Mike Douglass may refer to:

 Mike Douglass (urban planner), American urban planner and social scientist
 Mike Douglass (American football) (born 1955), former American football linebacker 
 Michael Douglass (sport shooter) (born 1976), American sports shooter

See also
 Mike Douglas (1920–2006), American Big Band era singer, entertainer, and television talk show host
 Michael Douglas (disambiguation)